Granite Curling Club is the name of a number of curling clubs:

Canada
CCA Granite Club - Cumberland, Ontario
Chatham Granite Club - Chatham, Ontario
Coaldale Granite Club - Coaldale, Alberta
Dundas Granite Curling Club - Dundas, Ontario
Granite Club - Toronto, Ontario
Granite Curling Club (Edmonton) - Edmonton, Alberta
Granite Curling Club (Winnipeg) - Winnipeg, Manitoba
Granite Curling Club of West Ottawa - Ottawa, Ontario
Grey Granite Club - Owen Sound, Ontario
Horne Granite Curling Club - New Liskeard, Ontario
Kitchener-Waterloo Granite Club - Waterloo, Ontario
Mission Granite Curling Club - Mission, British Columbia 
North Battleford-Granite Curling Club - North Battleford, Saskatchewan
North Bay Granite Club - North Bay, Ontario
Penticton Granite Club - Penticton, British Columbia 
Saskatoon-Granite Curling Club - Saskatoon, Saskatchewan
Stayner Granite Club - Stayner, Ontario
Sturgeon Falls Granite Club - Sturgeon Falls, Ontario

United States
Granite Curling Club (Hollis) - Hollis, New Hampshire 
Granite Curling Club (Seattle) - Seattle, Washington
Granite Curling Club of California, Inc. - Stockton, California